Mesoptila is a genus of moths in the family Geometridae.

Species
Mesoptila compsodes Meyrick, 1891
Mesoptila deviridata (Warren, 1907)
Mesoptila excita (Prout, 1958)
Mesoptila festiva (Prout, 1916)
Mesoptila melanolopha Swinhoe, 1895
Mesoptila murcida Mironov & Galsworthy, 2012
Mesoptila unitaeniata (Warren, 1906)

References

External links
Natural History Museum Lepidoptera genus database

Eupitheciini